Coxy's Big Break was a daily travel show which premiered in 2004. It had previously been screened nationally on Seven's HD channel, and was sold overseas.

History 
Hosted by Geoff "Coxy" Cox, the show visited locations across Australia and around the world. The local edition of the program kept Victoria as its primary focus. Other destinations included New Zealand, Hong Kong, Japan, Bali, Vanuatu, The Cook Islands, New Caledonia, China, Hawaii, Austria, Ireland, Thailand and Antarctica.

The Seven Network aired different travel shows in the weekend 5:30pm timeslot, including Queensland Weekender and The Great South East in Brisbane, Sydney Weekender in Sydney, and Discover in Adelaide.

The program was produced in PAL 1080i 25PsF high-definition after the start of 2007.

In March 2015, Cox announced on the show's website that the program would end after 11 years.

Reporters
 Melissa Hetherington
 Melanie-Jade Netherclift
 James Sherry
 Rhys Uhlich
 Des Dowling
 James Freemantle
 Angie Hilton
 Kelly Landry
 Nick Stratford
 Nicky Whelan
 Scherri-Lee Biggs

References

External links
 Official Site
 WTFN Entertainment

Seven Network original programming
Australian non-fiction television series
2004 Australian television series debuts
2015 Australian television series endings
Television shows set in Melbourne